Uladzislaw Duksa (born 7 July 1980) is a Belarusian professional football coach and former player. He spent his entire 16-year playing career with Smorgon.

His Matvey Dukso is also a professional footballer playing for Smorgon.

External links

1980 births
Living people
Belarusian footballers
FC Smorgon players
Association football defenders
Belarusian football managers
FC Smorgon managers